Neil Crawford may refer to:

 Neil Crawford (cricketer) (born 1958), English cricketer
 Neil Stanley Crawford (1931–1992), politician and jazz musician from Alberta, Canada